Hurricane Julia was a deadly tropical cyclone that caused significant impacts in Central America as a Category 1 hurricane in October 2022. The tenth named storm and fifth hurricane of the 2022 Atlantic hurricane season, Julia originated from a tropical wave in the tropical North Atlantic Ocean, and became a named storm on October 7. It took a southerly course through the Caribbean and passed just off the coast of Venezuela at the time it became a tropical cyclone. Only one storm on record, Tropical Storm Bret in 1993, has tracked further south over South America. 

On October 8, it became a hurricane and proceeded to make landfall in Nicaragua. It emerged into the Pacific Ocean as a tropical storm on October 10, becoming the eighteenth tropical storm of the 2022 Pacific hurricane season, and the second storm of the season to survive the crossover between the Atlantic–Pacific basin, after Bonnie in July. The storm then briefly moved along the coast of El Salvador, before moving inland and degenerating into an open trough over Guatemala on October 10. 

Julia brought heavy rains to much of Central America, causing life-threatening flash floods and deadly mudslides, exacerbating an already devastating rainy season. Floods, storm surge and the total or partial collapse of houses forced the evacuation of thousands of people. Its precursor disturbance triggered similar impacts in northern Venezuela. Julia caused 35 direct deaths and 54 indirect deaths and at least US $406 million in damage.

Meteorological history 

On October 2, the National Hurricane Center (NHC) began monitoring a tropical wave over the central tropical Atlantic. A broad area of low pressure formed on October 4, as it approached the southern Windward Islands. Due to the threat the developing system posed to land areas in the southern Caribbean, the NHC initiated advisories on it as Potential Tropical Cyclone Thirteen on October 6. Later that day, after satellite imagery and radar data indicated that the disturbance had attained sufficient circulation and organized convection, and after hurricane hunter survey data showed the presence of  winds north of the center, it was designated as a tropical depression. A strong burst of deep convection developed near the center of the depression as it moved across the Guajira Peninsula in the early morning of October 7, and soon afterwards, it strengthened into Tropical Storm Julia. Afterward, the morning burst of deep convection was stripped away by northwesterly shear, and the storm's low-level center was exposed for the next several hours. 

There was an increase in persistent and deep convection over the center, and the system began to gain strength. At 07:15 UTC, the storm made landfall near Pearl Lagoon, Nicaragua, at the same intensity. The system then gradually weakened to a tropical storm as it moved westward across Nicaragua, while maintaining a well-defined circulation and deep convection persisting near the center. Late on October 9, Julia left the Atlantic basin and was designated as an East Pacific tropical storm. Three hours later, its center emerged offshore into the Pacific, where it continued to weaken. It maintained a band of deep convection over the southern and eastern portions of its circulation. Later that same day, Julia degenerated into an open trough of low pressure.

Preparations and impact

Trinidad and Tobago 
On October 5, the disturbance brought heavy thunderstorms to several of South America's Windward Islands and the Caribbean coast. This resulted in one fatality, after a woman was swept away while trying to cross a river and drowned.

Venezuela 
Heavy rain from the storm caused widespread flooding and landslides. In Las Tejerías, in north-central Venezuela, at least 50 people died and 50 went missing when mud and debris inundated the town. 3,000 people were deployed to search for survivors.

Colombia 
The center of Julia passed just south of San Andrés Island while it was reaching hurricane strength east of Nicaragua. At least 174 homes were destroyed by Julia, and 5,247 homes and a health center were damaged. There have been no reports of fatalities.

Central America

Honduras 
The Government of Honduras opened more than 1,137 shelters nationwide, with 9,200 people utilizing them by October 10. A red alert, the highest level of warning, was issued for 10 of Honduras's 18 departments. Many homes were flooded along the Chamelecón River, which continued to rise as of October 10. Heavy rains brought water levels at the La Concepcion Dam and Jose Cecilio del Valle Dam above their maximum capacity. The Ulúa River rose to  near Santiago, exceeding the red alert stage for flooding. The most significant effects were felt in Yoro Department. Throughout Honduras, Julia killed four people and left two others missing as of October 11. A total of 103,960 people were affected, 3,412 of whom required evacuation. A total of 278 homes were destroyed and a further 397 suffered varying degrees of damage.

Nicaragua 
The hurricane left at least 1 million people without power and forced the evacuation of 13,000 families. Of the nation's 143 municipalities, 96 reported varying degrees of damage. Overall, Julia left at least $400 million in damage and five deaths in Nicaragua.

El Salvador 
On October 8, the Government of El Salvador declared an orange alert for the entire territory due to the approaching storm. Fishing and recreational activities in rivers, beaches, and lakes were suspended until October 11. Shelters for 3,000 people were prepared. A state of national emergency was declared due to the hurricane. The Government ended up declaring a red alert for civil protection due to the winds throughout the national territory. Tree falls were reported in different municipalities, impeding traffic and damaging cars. Falling branches blocked several major highways; roads were also damaged by landslides. Five soldiers died and another was injured in Comasagua when the home they were seeking refuge in collapsed. In all, Julia was responsible for ten deaths in El Salvador.

Costa Rica 
285 flooding reports were reported throughout Costa Rica. 470 people were transported to temporary hospitals, mostly in the South Pacific. Red alerts were issued throughout the country.

Guatemala 
In Guatemala, a total of 457,300 people were affected throughout Guatemala, 1,165 of whom required evacuation. At least 14 people died throughout Guatemala: nine in Huehuetenango Department and five in Alta Verapaz Department.

Panama 
In Panama, two people died in Panama near the border with Costa Rica and around 300 people required evacuation. The Ministry of Education of Panama suspended classes on October 10. A total of two landslides were reported. Due to heavy rains, nearly 868 people were affected. The Tierras Altas District saw significant damage, particularly to road infrastructure. Approximately 70 percent of roads in the district were damaged or blocked by debris, rendering some communities inaccessible. Roughly  of crops valued at $6–7 million, half of which were potatoes, were lost.

See also 
 List of Atlantic–Pacific crossover hurricanes
 List of Category 1 Atlantic hurricanes
 Timeline of the 2022 Atlantic hurricane season
 Timeline of the 2022 Pacific hurricane season
 Tropical cyclones in 2022
 Weather of 2022
 Hurricane Cesar–Douglas (1996) - another deadly system had a similar track and crossed into the Pacific basin
 Hurricane Iota (2020) – an intense hurricane that had a similar track, affecting Central America

References

External links 

 The National Hurricane Center's advisory archive on Hurricane Julia (Atlantic Basin)
 The National Hurricane Center's advisory archive on Tropical Storm Julia (Eastern Pacific Basin)

2022 Atlantic hurricane season
2022 meteorology
2022 Pacific hurricane season
Category 1 Atlantic hurricanes
Eastern Pacific tropical storms
Hurricanes in Colombia
Hurricanes in Costa Rica
Hurricanes in Nicaragua
Hurricanes in Venezuela
2022 in Colombia
2022 in Costa Rica
2022 in Nicaragua
2022 in Venezuela
Tropical cyclones in 2022
2022 disasters in South America
2022 disasters in North America